The Hinz BLT-ARA is a German homebuilt aircraft that was designed and produced by L and B Hinz of Filderstadt. When it was available the aircraft was supplied as in the form of plans and a 300-page builder's manual for amateur construction.

Design and development
The BLT-ARA is a development of the earlier Hinz BL1-KEA which was first flown in 1989.

The BLT-ARA features a cantilever low-wing, a two-seats-in-side-by-side configuration enclosed cockpit under a bubble canopy, T-tail, retractable conventional landing gear and a single engine in tractor configuration.

The aircraft is made from fibreglass, using a moldless construction technique. The wings and tailplane are detachable, similar to a glider's to allow ground transport or storage in a trailer.

The manufacturer estimated the construction time from the supplied plans as 3000 hours.

Operational history
By 1998 the company reported that 13 sets of plans had been sold.

Specifications (BLT-ARA)

References

BLT-ARA
1990s German sport aircraft
1990s German civil utility aircraft
Single-engined tractor aircraft
Low-wing aircraft
Homebuilt aircraft
T-tail aircraft